Todruyeh (also Romanized as Todrūyeh, Tadrooyeh, and Tadrūyeh; also known as Tūdarān, Tudaru, Tudirān, and Tūdorān) is a village in Godeh Rural District, in the Central District of Bastak County, Hormozgan Province, Iran. At the 2006 census, its population was 1,998, in 386 families.

References 

Populated places in Bastak County